Oakridge Secondary School is one of the government-operated high schools (as opposed to collegiate institutes) in the neighbourhood of Oakridge in London, Ontario, Canada. This school is well-known for being 1 out of 2 schools in London Ontario with the International Baccalaureate (I.B) The school enrolls around 1000 students, and is located on Oxford Street in West London. The school's demonym is Oakridge Oaks and its colours are red, blue and gold.

History
Founded as a county school in 1959, Oakridge High School became Oakridge Secondary School when London annexed a large part of the surrounding countryside in 1960. The school became the first in London to adopt three colours: red, blue and gold. Its stability encouraged a large financial investment in modernizing and upgrading the physical plant in a major renovation during 1994–95. The school's Latin motto is "Nostrum viret robur" (Our strength grows as the Oaks).

Arts
Oakridge has a drama department, which presents a major production every second year. In recent years it has presented High School Musical, High School Musical 2, Rent, An Extremely Goofy Movie, Alice in Wonderland and The Little Mermaid. Recently, no shows have been produced, and the drama department is reduced only to drama classes.

Student Parliament
In 2013–2014 Oakridge's Student Parliament raised more than $17,000 for their "Oaktober" fundraiser for United Way.  There are currently 10 executive positions on Oakridge's Student Parliament, consisting of mainly grade 12 students. In addition to the executive positions there are five student representatives for each grade in addition to the DC classes.

Music-related activities/clubs 

Coffee House
Concert Band
Concert Choir
Intermediate Band
Music Council
School Show
Jazz Band
Fortnite-Themed Concert

Athletics 

Badminton (boys and girls)
Basketball (boys and girls)
Curling (boys and girls)
Cross country running (boys and girls)
Football (juniors and seniors)
Fencing (boys and girls)
Golf (boys and girls)
Hockey (boys and girls)
Rowing Club (boys and girls)
Rugby (boys and girls)
Soccer (boys and girls)
Swimming (boys and girls)
E-sports (fortnite, boys and girls)
Tennis (boys and girls)
Track and field (boys and girls)
Volleyball (boys and girls)

Achievements 
The Oakridge boys curling team won the TVRAA Championship in 2018 and 2019.

Notable alumni
 Andreas Athanasiou
 Josh Brown
 Jenny Jones
 Paul Kozachuk
 Tom McCamus
 Megan Park
 Chris Potter (actor)
 Steve Stoyanovich

See also
List of high schools in Ontario

References

External links

Official school website

High schools in London, Ontario
Educational institutions established in 1959
1959 establishments in Ontario